This is a list of named lunar craters. The large majority of these features are impact craters. The crater nomenclature is governed by the International Astronomical Union, and this listing only includes features that are officially recognized by that scientific society.



Craters 
The lunar craters are listed in the following subsections. Where a formation has associated satellite craters, these are detailed on the main crater description pages.

Catalog 

Lunar craters are listed alphabetically on the following partial lists:

 List of craters on the Moon: A–B
 List of craters on the Moon: C–F
 List of craters on the Moon: G–K
 List of craters on the Moon: L–N
 List of craters on the Moon: O–Q
 List of craters on the Moon: R–S
 List of craters on the Moon: T–Z

Prominent craters 

Locations and diameters of some prominent craters on the near side of the Moon:

See also 
 List of lunar features
 List of people with craters of the Moon named after them
 List of maria on the Moon
 List of mountains on the Moon
 List of valleys on the Moon
 Selenography

References 

The following sources were used as references on the individual crater pages.

External links 
The following reference sites were also used during the assembly of the crater information.
 Astronomica Langrenus — Italian Lunar Web Site
 Gazetteer of Planetary Nomenclature
 Moon map. List of craters on the Moon   
 Lunar Atlases at the Lunar & Planetary Institute
 Digital Lunar Orbiter Photographic Atlas of the Moon
 Lunar Nomenclature
 Lunar Photo of the Day by Charles A. Wood et al.

Moon